Monika Navickienė (born 25 June 1981 in Telšiai) is a Lithuanian politician, a Member of the Seimas for Naujoji Vilnia constituency. She previous was an Executive Secretary of Homeland Union - Lithuanian Christian Democrats from 2013 to 2016. Designate as the Vice Chairwoman of the Homeland Union in 2017.

On 7 December 2020, she was approved to be the Minister of Social Security and Labour in the Šimonytė Cabinet.

Biography 
In 2003 received a bachelor's degree in philosophy in Vilnius University. In 2005 graduated from Mykolas Romeris University. She holds a master's degree in Tax Administration.

Since 2004 to 2011 she worked in the private sector in various positions.

Political career
Since 2011 Navickienė is a member of Homeland Union - Lithuanian Christian Democrats. In 2012, she was Coordinator of the Homeland Union Campaign in the elections to the Seimas of the Republic of Lithuania and Assistant of Member of the Seimas.

From 2013 to 2016 Navickienė was Executive Secretary of Homeland Union. Since 2013 she is Homeland Union - Lithuanian Christian Democrats member of the Presidium and Council.

In 2016, Seimas elections Navickienė was Homeland Union candidate for the Minister of Social Security and Labour.

Elected to the Seimas of the Republic of Lithuania in 2016 for Naujoji Vilnia constituency.

She was re-elected to the Seimas in 2020. She was nominated by Prime Minister Ingrida Šimonytė to serve as Minister of Social Security and Labour in her cabinet.

Controversies 
In 2022, Navickienė had initiated a bill, which was already approved of by the Seimas, that would reduce maternity leave payments. Since August 1, 2022, women who will decide to raise a newborn child at home for no longer than 18 months, will receive a payment size of 60% of their salary while women staying on maternity leave for 24 months will get a payment size of 45% of their salary the first year and only 25% in the second year.

References

1981 births
Living people
Women members of the Seimas
Homeland Union politicians
Vilnius University alumni
Mykolas Romeris University alumni
Ministers of Social Security and Labour of Lithuania
Women government ministers of Lithuania
21st-century Lithuanian women politicians
21st-century Lithuanian politicians
Members of the Seimas